The Church of San Esteban (Spanish: Iglesia de San Esteban) is a church located in Fresno de Torote, Spain. It was declared Bien de Interés Cultural in 1996.

Built in the late 16th-early 17th century, it is an example of late Mudéjar-Renaissance architecture.

References 

Churches in the Community of Madrid
Mudéjar architecture in the Community of Madrid
Renaissance architecture in Castilla–La Mancha
17th-century Roman Catholic church buildings in Spain
Bien de Interés Cultural landmarks in the Community of Madrid